Kaatyayani is a Hindi-language television channel, owned by Veecon Media and Broadcasting Pvt Ltd. The channel is available across all major cable and DTH platforms, as well as online. The channel owner named Veecon Media and Broadcasting Pvt Ltd has 2 Private Satellite TV Channel licences under names of Harvest TV (renamed Tiranga TV) and Kaatyayani according to Ministry of Information and Broadcasting (India).

References

External links
 

Hindi-language television channels in India
Television channels and stations established in 2005
Hindi-language television stations
Television channels based in Noida